Delias hallstromi is a butterfly in the family Pieridae. It was described by Leonard J. Sanford and Neville Henry Bennett in 1955. It is endemic to Papua New Guinea, where it has been recorded from the Central Mountains, the Chimbu Province and Western Province.

References

External links
Delias at Markku Savela's Lepidoptera and Some Other Life Forms

hallstromi
Butterflies described in 1955